Garbów  is a village in Lublin County, Lublin Voivodeship, in eastern Poland. It is the seat of the gmina (administrative district) called Gmina Garbów. The village has a population of approximately 2,000. It lies on the Kurówka river, and has a mill and a sugar refinery.

History

The village was first mentioned in 1326 as a seat of a separate parish. In the 15th century it was a personal property of the Odrowąż clan. In 1785 it was sold to Jacek Jezierski, the castellan of Łuków and a marshall of the szlachta who made the village receive the Magdeburg Law. During the Kościuszko Uprising of 1794 the town was a battlefield of the last skirmish between the forces of Muscovy and those of Poland. After that the town was annexed by Russia and its city status was withdrawn. Currently the village is formally divided onto two separate sołectwos: Garbów I and Garbów II. It is probable, that the two will be eventually merge and receive city charter again.  A notable historical person from Garbów is Salomon Morel, as he was a high ranking Soviet Bolshevik Official during the reign of Stalin and an accused war criminal.

There are some notable tourist attractions in the village. Among them is an 18th-century classicist palace, a facade of a 17th-century church destroyed in 1915 and a Gothic revival church from the early 20th century with a 1000 kilograms bell from 1512.

References

External links
 

Villages in Lublin County
Battlefields